Ritika Arun Bhopalkar (born 18 December 1987) is Madhya Pradeshi cricketer. She played for Mumbai, Madhya Pradesh, West Zone and Central Zone. She has played 65 Limited over matches and 30 Women's Twenty20.

References 

1987 births
Mumbai women cricketers
Madhya Pradesh women cricketers
West Zone women cricketers
Central Zone women cricketers
People from Madhya Pradesh
Living people